Handerki is a village in the Sedam taluk of Kalaburagi district  in the Indian state of Karnataka.

Demographics
Per the 2011 Census of India, has a total population of 4002; of whom 1995 are male and 2007 female.

History
Handaraki is famous for the ancient Lokeshwara temple and Janameshwara temple located in the village.

See also
 Manyakheta
 Udagi
 Sedam
 Gulbarga
 Karnataka

References

Villages in Kalaburagi district
Hindu temples in Kalaburagi district